Andréa Ursina Zimmermann (born 18 August 1976) from Monthey is a female Swiss ski mountaineer and mountain runner.

Zimmermann was born in Biel/Bienne. She competed first in the 2000 Trophée du Muveran race and has been member of the national team since 2001.

Selected results

Ski mountaineering 
 2001:
 3rd, Swiss Cup, scratch
 2002:
 10th, World Championship team race (together with Gabrielle Magnenat)
 2004:
 2nd, Patrouille des Glaciers (together with Gabrielle Magnenat and Jeanine Bapst)
 8th, World Championship team race (together with Gabrielle Magnenat)
 2005:
 4th, European Championship (together with  Séverine Pont-Combe)
 2006:
 2nd, Trophée des Gastlosen, together with Marie Troillet
 6th, World Championship team race (together with Gabrielle Magnenat)
 2007:
 7th, Trofeo Mezzalama (together with Anne Carron-Bender and Christine Diaque)
 2010:
 3rd, Sellaronda Skimarathon, together with Catherine Mabillard
 2012:
 2nd, Trophée des Gastlosen, together with Catherine Mabillard

Pierra Menta 

 2005: 5th, together with Jeanine Bapst
 2007: 5th, together with Gabrielle Magnenat

Patrouille des Glaciers 

 2008: 6th (and 2nd in the "civilian women" ranking), together with Chantal Daucourt and Sabine Gentieu
 2010: 3rd, (and 1st in the "civilian women" ranking), together with Catherine Mabillard and Sophie Dusautoir Bertrand

Running 
 2004:
 2nd (women I), Jeizibärg-Lauf, Gampel
 2008:
 2nd, Jeizibärg-Lauf / Valais Mountain Running Championship, Gampel
 3rd, Dérupe Vercorin

External links 
 Andréa Zimmermann at skimountaineering.org
 TEDx talk of Andréa Zimmermann

References 

1976 births
Living people
Swiss female ski mountaineers
Swiss female long-distance runners
Swiss female mountain runners
People from Monthey
People from Biel/Bienne
Sportspeople from the canton of Bern
Sportspeople from Valais